The 2018–19 season was the 51st season of the Northern Premier League. After eleven seasons, the two divisions of Division One were re-aligned from North and South to West and East. 
The League sponsors for the last time were Evo-Stik.

Premier Division

Team changes
The following 9 clubs left the Premier Division before the season -

 Altrincham – promoted to National League North
 Ashton United – promoted to National League North
 Barwell – transferred to Southern League Premier Division Central
 Coalville Town – transferred to Southern League Premier Division Central
 Halesowen Town – transferred to Southern League Premier Division Central
 Rushall Olympic – transferred to Southern League Premier Division Central
 Stourbridge – transferred to Southern League Premier Division Central
 Sutton Coldfield Town – relegated to Southern League Division One Central
 Shaw Lane – folded during the off season 

The following 7 clubs joined the Premier Division before the season -

 Bamber Bridge – promoted from NPL Division One North
 Basford United – promoted from NPL Division One South
 Gainsborough Trinity – relegated from National League North
 Hyde United – promoted from NPL Division One North
 North Ferriby United – relegated from National League North
 Scarborough Athletic – promoted from NPL Division One North
 South Shields – promoted from NPL Division One North

League table

Top 10 goalscorers

Results table

Play-offs

Semi-finals

Final

Super final

Stadia and locations

Division One West

Team changes
The following 9 clubs left Division One North before the season -

 Bamber Bridge – promoted to NPL Premier Division
 Brighouse Town – transferred to NPL Division One East
 Goole – relegated to Northern Counties East League Premier Division
 Hyde United – promoted to NPL Premier Division
 Ossett Albion – merged with Ossett Town into Ossett United and transferred to NPL Division One East
 Ossett Town – merged with Ossett Albion into Ossett United and transferred to NPL Division One East
 Scarborough Athletic – promoted to NPL Premier Division
 South Shields – promoted to NPL Premier Division
 Tadcaster Albion – transferred to NPL Division One East

The following 7 clubs joined Division One West before the season -

 Chasetown – transferred from NPL Division One South
 Kidsgrove Athletic – transferred from NPL Division One South
 Leek Town – transferred from NPL Division One South
 Market Drayton Town – transferred from NPL Division One South
 Newcastle Town – transferred from NPL Division One South
 Runcorn Linnets – promoted from North West Counties League Premier Division
 Widnes – promoted from North West Counties League Premier Division

League table

Top 10 goalscorers

Results table

Play-offs

Semi-finals

Final

Stadia and locations

Division One East

Team changes
The following 11 clubs left Division One South before the season -

 Alvechurch – promoted to Southern League Premier Division Central
 Basford United – promoted to NPL Premier Division
 Bedworth United – promoted to Southern League Premier Division Central
 Chasetown – transferred to NPL Division One West
 Corby Town – transferred to Southern League Division One Central
 Kidsgrove Athletic – transferred to NPL Division One West
 Leek Town – transferred to NPL Division One West
 Market Drayton Town – transferred to NPL Division One West
 Newcastle Town – transferred to NPL Division One West
 Peterborough Sports – transferred to Southern League Division One Central
 Romulus – relegated to Midland League Premier Division

The following 9 clubs joined Division One East before the season -

 AFC Mansfield – promoted from Northern Counties East League Premier Division
 Brighouse Town – transferred from NPL Division One North
 Marske United – promoted from Northern League Division One
 Morpeth Town – promoted from Northern League Division One
 Ossett United – new club, merger of Ossett Albion and Ossett Town; transferred from NPL Division One North
 Pickering Town – promoted from Northern Counties East League Premier Division
 Pontefract Collieries – promoted from Northern Counties East League Premier Division
 Tadcaster Albion – transferred from NPL Division One North
 Wisbech Town – promoted from United Counties League Premier Division

League table

Top 10 goalscorers

Results table

Play-offs

Semi-finals

Final

Stadia and locations

Step 4 play-off winners rating

Challenge Cup

The 2018–19 Northern Premier League Challenge Cup, known as the 18–19 Integro Doodson League Cup for sponsorship reasons, is the 49th season of the Northern Premier League Challenge Cup, the main cup competition in the Northern Premier League. It is sponsored by Doodson Sport for a seventh consecutive season. 61 clubs from England and one from Wales will enter the competition, beginning with the First Round, and all ties will end after 90 minutes and conclude with penalties.

The defending champions, Atherton Collieries, were defeated in the first round by Droylsden.

First round

Second round

Third round

Quarter-finals

Semi-finals

Final

See also
Northern Premier League
2018–19 Isthmian League
2018–19 Southern League

Notes

References

External links
Official website

Northern Premier League seasons
7